IC Publications is a publishing house founded in 1957 in Paris by Afif Ben Yedder. Its headquarters are now based in London Farringdon.

The Group's magazines are read by 2.6 million people in over 100 countries.

In English, IC publishes New African, African Business, African Banker, New African Woman and, in French, Le Magazine De L’Afrique, Le Magazine Des Dirigeants Africains, Le Magazine De La Banque Et De La Finance and Femme Africaine. Its flagship title, African Business Magazine, is a widely respected source of business and investment news across the continent.

References

External links 
 

Magazine publishing companies of France
Publishing companies established in 1957